Polarization or polarisation may refer to:

Mathematics
Polarization of an Abelian variety, in the mathematics of complex manifolds
Polarization of an algebraic form, a technique for expressing a homogeneous polynomial in a simpler fashion by adjoining more variables
Polarization identity, expresses an inner product in terms of its associated norm
Polarization (Lie algebra)

Physical sciences
Polarization (waves), the ability of waves to oscillate in more than one direction, in particular polarization of light, responsible for example for the glare-reducing effect of polarized sunglasses
Polarization (antenna), the state of polarization (in the above sense) of electromagnetic waves transmitted by or received by a radio antenna
Dielectric polarization, charge separation in insulating materials:
Polarization density, volume dielectric polarization
Dipolar polarization, orientation of permanent dipoles
Ionic polarization, displacement of ions in a crystal
Maxwell–Wagner–Sillars polarization, slow long-distance charge separation in dielectric spectroscopy on inhomogeneous soft matter
Polarization (electrochemistry), a change in the equilibrium potential of an electrochemical reaction
Concentration polarization, the shift of the electrochemical potential difference across an electrochemical cell from its equilibrium value
Spin polarization, the degree by which the spin of elementary particles is aligned to a given direction
Polarizability, an electrical property of atoms or molecules and a separate magnetic property of subatomic particles 
Polarization function, a feature of some molecular modelling methods
Photon polarization, the mathematical link between wave polarization and spin polarization
Vacuum polarization, a process in which a background electromagnetic field produces virtual electron-positron pairs

Social sciences
Polarization (economics), faster decrease of moderate-skill jobs relative to low-skill and high-skill jobs
Political polarization, when public opinion divides and becomes oppositional
Social polarization, segregation of society into social groups, from high-income to low-income
Group polarization, tendency of a group to make more extreme decisions than individuals' initial inclinations
Attitude polarization, when disagreement becomes more extreme as different parties consider evidence
Racial polarization, when a population with varying ancestry is divided into distinct racial groups

Others
Polarization (album), an album by American jazz trombonist and composer Julian Priester 
Polarization, in many disciplines, is a tendency to be located close to one of the opposite ends of a continuum

See also
Polar (disambiguation)
Polar opposite (disambiguation)
Polarity (disambiguation)
Pole (disambiguation)
Reversal (disambiguation)